Inspector Clouseau is a 1968 British comedy film, and the third installment in The Pink Panther film series. It was directed by Bud Yorkin, written by brothers Frank Waldman and Tom Waldman and stars Alan Arkin as the title character. It was filmed by Mirisch Films at the MGM-British Studios, Borehamwood  and in Europe.

Screenwriter Frank Waldman would later co-write The Return of the Pink Panther, The Pink Panther Strikes Again, Revenge of the Pink Panther, and Trail of the Pink Panther.  Tom Waldman would co-write Trail with Frank.

Unlike the previous instalments in the film series, Blake Edwards was not the director, nor did Henry Mancini write the film's score, and the title role was not portrayed by Peter Sellers. All three were involved at that time with the film The Party. Nonetheless, The Mirisch Company wanted to proceed with this project, so when Sellers and Edwards declined to participate, Mirisch decided to proceed without them. The film languished in obscurity and although it has been released to home video on VHS, DVD and Blu-ray, it was not included in 2004's Pink Panther Collection but was later added to the Ultimate collection released in 2008.

The film received mostly negative reviews and performed poorly at the box office.

Plot

In London, Sir Charles Braithwaite (Patrick Cargill), Commissioner for Scotland Yard, is struggling to solve an organized crime case. A gang has been performing robberies across Europe and the case has gone cold. England's Prime Minister decides to request outside help to solve the case, which the press view as an insult. French Inspector Jacques Clouseau (Alan Arkin) is the one sent to assist. Sir Charles meets with Clouseau and briefs him on the case. Three suspects were in custody, but two, Frenchie LeBec (Tutte Lemkow) and Steven Frey (Michael Ripper) escaped. The only suspect still in custody is Addison Steele (Barry Foster).

Clouseau leaves to question Steele, but Sir Charles warns him not to trust anyone, even those in the Yard, as he is suspicious that there is a mole among their ranks. Clouseau arrives at the prison to interview Steele, who has been working as the prison's barber and when Clouseau arrives, Steele is cutting the hair of the warden's son, Clyde Hargreaves (Clive Francis). Once Clyde is finished, Steele tells Clouseau that he does not know who the leader of the gang is, but only knows him by the name of "Johnny Rainbow". Clouseau is tricked into a shave by Steele, and during the hot towel treatment, Steele uses chloroform to subdue Clouseau and escape custody.

When Clouseau returns to Scotland Yard, Superintendent Weaver (Frank Finlay) gives Clouseau some experimental disguised weapons that should help him with his investigation. Frenchie stalks Clouseau and attempts to assassinate the inspector, however Clouseau accidentally kills him with one of Weaver's weapons. Sir Charles is annoyed that Clouseau killed Frenchie, as they were unable to interrogate him. After Clouseau realizes his food has been poisoned, he finds a matchbook from a nearby inn called Tudor Arms on Frenchie's body. Clouseau goes to the inn to search for more leads, where he is seduced by two women that subdue and kidnap him. They pour rubber on his face, which they use to make a mold of the inspector's likeness.

Clouseau accidentally kills the owner of the inn (Arthur Lovegrove) by crushing him with a bed and realizes that he has a Johnny Rainbow tattoo. Clouseau goes to Frenchie's funeral in France to look for more leads, where he is attacked by the gang. Fortunately, Weaver's maid, Lisa Morell (Delia Boccardo), arrives and rescues him. Lisa reveals she is actually an agent for Interpol who has been sent to help him. Clouseau does not believe Lisa's story and arrests her, but his superior, Préfet de Police Geffrion (David Bauer), confirms she is telling the truth.

At the gang's hideout, Johnny Rainbow is revealed to be Clyde Hargreaves. He has used the cast of Clouseau's face to create several masks that resemble the inspector. Rainbow explains his daring plan: the gang will rob thirteen Swiss banks simultaneously, and Clouseau will take the fall for the crime. Clouseau learns of the plan and goes to the hideout to investigate. Two of Rainbow's men, Bomber LeBec (Anthony Ainley) and Stockton (Robert Russell) follow Clouseau and attempt to kidnap him, but Weaver arrives and foils this. However, he slips a train ticket from Le Havre, France to Zurich, Switzerland in Clouseau’s pocket and walks away, thus revealing him as the mole.

On the Train, Weaver attempts to kill Clouseau and later poses as him in Zurich. Lisa warns him about Weaver, not realizing she is really speaking to Weaver in disguise. Lisa is kidnapped by the gang and Rainbow puts on the disguise as Clouseau. Weaver and Rainbow feed the Swiss authorities false information about the robberies and order the bank presidents to put all their funds into the waiting armored cars outside for "safekeeping". The money is then switched into fake Lindt & Sprüngli vans. They take the money to one of Lindt’s chocolate factories and package the stolen money like chocolate bars and then put them into a ship on the Limmat River.

The real Clouseau is arrested for the robberies and is able to convince the authorities of the truth. Weaver attempts to escape by disguising himself as Clouseau, but is killed in a fight with Clouseau, which proves that Clouseau is innocent. Clouseau goes to rescue Lisa and chases after Steele, though he is eventually captured by Rainbow's men. Clouseau manages to escape using one of Weaver's weapons and sinks the ship. The heist is foiled, but Rainbow and his men escape. Clouseau returns to France after saying goodbye to a grateful Sir Charles.

Cast

Cast notes
In addition to the title role, Arkin also played the members of the gang whenever they were disguised as Clouseau, with the other actors' voices dubbed onto the soundtrack.

Production
Although the two previous Pink Panther films (The Pink Panther and A Shot in the Dark), both directed by Blake Edwards and starring Peter Sellers were successful, Sellers and Edwards clashed during production and vowed never to work together again. Producer Walter Mirisch was interested in making a third Pink Panther film, but Sellers repeatedly refused the role. Following Alan Arkin's success in The Russians Are Coming, the Russians Are Coming, Mirisch cast Arkin in  the role of Clouseau. Blake Edwards turned down the director's chores so Mirisch hired Bud Yorkin. Just prior to the beginning of production, Sellers contacted Mirisch stating that only he could play Clouseau and would appear in the film if he was given script approval. Mirisch turned him down. 

The film was produced by Lewis J. Rachmil as one of Mirisch Films United Kingdom's film company qualifying for Eady Levy funds. Location scenes for Inspector Clouseau were shot in Europe.

The animated opening credits were created and designed by DePatie-Freleng Enterprises and animated by London-based TVC, using DePatie-Freleng`s character design of The Inspector from the series of cartoon shorts under that title. (DePatie Freleng also animated the Pink Panther cartoon shorts, as well as the opening credit sequences for most of the Edwards-Sellers Clouseau films).

Reception
Renata Adler of The New York Times was negative, calling the film "one of those episodic, all-purpose arbitrary comedies in which anything goes—and nothing works." Variety praised the film as "a lively, entertaining and episodic story of bank robbers. Good scripting, better acting and topnotch direction get the most out of the material." Roger Ebert gave the film 2.5 stars out of 4, writing that "Arkin provides some funny scenes," but that they "are the exception and not the rule, however. For most of the time, events move pretty slowly, and the camera lingers on Arkin, waiting for moments of inspiration that never come." Time magazine wrote, "Arkin follows meticulously in his predecessor's flatfootsteps, but the result is only a parody of a parody," adding, "Bud Yorkin's slovenly direction makes the film look as if every expense had been spared, trapping Arkin in a farce of habit that will probably retire Clouseau to oblivion — one picture too late." Kevin Thomas of the Los Angeles Times called it "a dull comedy ... that deflates faster than a leaky balloon. Not that it's the highly gifted Arkin's fault. He tries and tries (and occasionally succeeds) but the uninspired script is hopeless from the start." Leo Sullivan of The Washington Post called it "a mirthless failure." Penelope Gilliatt of The New Yorker called it "an incredibly bad film, but Alan Arkin is sometimes very funny in it, especially when he doesn't try to be." The Monthly Film Bulletin wrote, "Though it moves at a fast enough pace and is more inventively directed than A Shot in the Dark (Bud Yorkin makes good use of his elaborate sets and expensive gadgetry), this third film in the Clouseau series finally demonstrates that the joke has run out of steam. That it works at all is largely due to Alan Arkin's performance as Clouseau, which emerges as a hilarious blend of Keaton and Sellers."

Notes

External links
 
 
 

1968 films
British comedy films
British sequel films
1960s English-language films
Films directed by Bud Yorkin
Films set in Cologne
Films set in England
Films set in London
Films set in Switzerland
Films set in Zürich
Films set in Paris
Films shot in Zürich
The Pink Panther films
United Artists films
1960s police comedy films
1968 comedy films
Films scored by Ken Thorne
Films shot at MGM-British Studios
American films with live action and animation
1960s American films
1960s British films